Izmaylovsky (masculine), Izmaylovskaya (feminine), or Izmaylovskoye (neuter) is the name of several rural localities in Russia.

Modern localities
, a settlement in Izmaylovsky Selsoviet of Kizilsky District in Chelyabinsk Oblast
, a village in Kenoretsky Selsoviet of Plesetsky District in Arkhangelsk Oblast

Alternative names